India Hook is a census-designated place (CDP) in York County, South Carolina, United States. The majority of India Hook is annexed into the city of Rock Hill, but as of 2010 India Hook is still considered to be a CDP. It is one of the three communities located on Lake Wylie.

The population was 2,051 at the 2010 census.

Geography
India Hook is located at  (35.014366, -81.044490).

Demographics

2020 census

As of the 2020 United States census, there were 3,817 people, 1,685 households, and 1,195 families residing in the CDP.

2000 census
As of the census of 2000, there were 1,614 people, 641 households, and 496 families residing in the CDP. The population density was 582.0 people per square mile (225.0/km2). There were 702 housing units at an average density of 253.2/sq mi (97.8/km2). The racial makeup of the CDP was 96.59% White, 1.05% African American, 0.50% Native American, 0.81% Asian, and 1.05% from two or more races. Hispanic or Latino of any race were 0.25% of the population.

There were 641 households, out of which 32.8% had children under the age of 18 living with them, 65.7% were married couples living together, 8.3% had a female householder with no husband present, and 22.5% were non-families. 20.0% of all households were made up of individuals, and 4.2% had someone living alone who was 65 years of age or older. The average household size was 2.52 and the average family size was 2.88.

In the CDP, the population was spread out, with 23.0% under the age of 18, 5.9% from 18 to 24, 30.0% from 25 to 44, 29.1% from 45 to 64, and 11.8% who were 65 years of age or older. The median age was 40 years. For every 100 females, there were 95.6 males. For every 100 females age 18 and over, there were 98.7 males.

The median income for a household in the CDP was $54,266, and the median income for a family was $62,566. Males had a median income of $37,214 versus $24,646 for females. The per capita income for the CDP was $24,693. About 6.2% of families and 7.8% of the population were below the poverty line, including 10.6% of those under age 18 and 3.7% of those age 65 or over.

See also
Lesslie, South Carolina
Riverview, South Carolina

References

Census-designated places in South Carolina
Census-designated places in York County, South Carolina